Laundry list may refer to:

Project Laundry List, a New Hampshire-based project to encourage and allow use of clotheslines
Laundry list song
List of laundry topics

See also

 Shopping list
 To do list
 Checklist
 Laundry